The 1966 NBA playoffs was the postseason tournament of the National Basketball Association's 1965–66 season. The tournament concluded with the Eastern Division champion Boston Celtics defeating the Western Division champion Los Angeles Lakers 4 games to 3 in the NBA Finals.

The Celtics won their eighth consecutive NBA title and ninth overall, defeating the Lakers in the Finals for a fifth straight time.

This was the last NBA playoffs under the "top team in each division gets a first-round bye" format established in 1955, although teams receiving a bye would be reused in 1975, and strictly for division winners from 1977–1983 (albeit in a four-round playoff format). the 1967 NBA playoffs featured an eight-team tournament with no first-round byes.

Bracket

Division Semifinals

Eastern Division Semifinals

(2) Boston Celtics vs. (3) Cincinnati Royals

This was the third playoff meeting between these two teams, with the Celtics winning both prior meetings.

Western Division Semifinals

(2) Baltimore Bullets vs. (3) St. Louis Hawks

This was the second playoff meeting between these two teams, with the Bullets winning the first meeting.

Division Finals

Eastern Division Finals

(1) Philadelphia 76ers vs. (2) Boston Celtics

This was the 10th playoff meeting between these two teams, with the Celtics winning five of the first nine meetings.

Western Division Finals

(1) Los Angeles Lakers vs. (3) St. Louis Hawks

This was the eighth playoff meeting between these two teams, with the Hawks winning five of the first seven meetings.

NBA Finals: (E2) Boston Celtics vs. (W1) Los Angeles Lakers

This was the fifth playoff meeting between these two teams, with the Celtics winning the first four meetings.

See also
1966 NBA Finals
1965–66 NBA season

References

External links
Basketball-Reference.com's 1966 NBA Playoffs page

National Basketball Association playoffs
Playoffs

fi:NBA-kausi 1965–1966#Pudotuspelit